Colpaert is a surname. Notable people with the surname include:

Alfred Colpaert, Dutch professor of physical geography
Carl Colpaert (born 1963), American film director
Dick Colpaert (born 1943), American baseball player
Gustave Colpaert, Belgian wrestler
Steve Colpaert (born 1986), Belgian footballer